Delta—Richmond East was a federal electoral district in the province of British Columbia, Canada, that was represented in the House of Commons of Canada from 2004 until 2013.

Geography

It was located in the Metro Vancouver, and consisted of:
 the south east part of the City of Richmond,
 the village of Steveston in Richmond,
 the west part of the Corporation of Delta,
 Musqueam Indian Reserve No. 4, and
 Tsawwassen Indian Reserve.

Demographics

This riding's population is 38% immigrants.  About 20% is Chinese-Canadian. The service sector, retail trade, construction, and manufacturing are the major sources of employment in this riding. The average family income is almost $90,000. Unemployment is around 4.8%.

History
The electoral district was created in 2003 from Delta—South Richmond and Richmond ridings. It was dissolved in 2011 into Delta and Steveston—Richmond East.

Members of Parliament

Election results

See also
 List of Canadian federal electoral districts
 Past Canadian electoral districts

References

 Expenditures - 2008 from Elections Canada website
Election results from Parliament of Canada website

Notes

External links
 Website of the  Parliament of Canada
 Map of Delta—Richmond East riding archived by Elections Canada

Former federal electoral districts of British Columbia
Federal electoral districts in Greater Vancouver and the Fraser Valley
Politics of Delta, British Columbia
Politics of Richmond, British Columbia